al-Almani is a nisba meaning "German" or from Germany. It may refer to:
Abu Talha al-Almani, Denis Cuspert, ISIL terrorist
Abu Umar al-Almani, Yamin Abou-Zand, ISIL terrorist

Nisbas
Lists of German people